Terespol is a town in eastern Poland on the border with Belarus. It lies on the border river Bug, directly opposite the city of Brest, Belarus, making it a border town. It has 5,794 inhabitants as of 2014.

Overview
Since 1999 Terespol has been within Biała Podlaska County in Lublin Voivodeship. Between 1975 and 1998 it belonged to Biała Podlaska Voivodeship. The town is a busy border crossing between Poland and Belarus on the European route E30 which links Berlin-Warsaw-Minsk-Moscow. Another crossing into Brest is located at Kukuryki northwest of Terespol. There is also a local train between Brest and Terespol. It comes 3 times a day. The trip takes 18 minutes and is a very comfortable way of crossing border between Belarus and Poland.

Terespol features in a novel by the Yiddish Nobel Prize-winning writer Isaac Bashevis Singer, The Family Moskat (1950), in which the young protagonist, Asa Heshel Bennet, comes to Warsaw from his hometown of Terespol Minor to study.

History
The town of Terespol is located in the spot of a village called Błotków or Błotkowo, which existed in the 16th and 17th centuries. In 1512, this area became property of a nobleman called Iwan Sapieha of Kodeń. Later it belonged to the Hornostaj and Dorohostajski families. Administratively it was part of the Podlaskie Voivodeship until 1566, and the Brest Litovsk Voivodeship afterwards until the Partitions of Poland. In 1609, King Sigismund III of Poland built here a spacious palace with a vast garden. Due to proximity to the city of Brześć Litewski (Brest), the settlement prospered. During Swedish invasion of Poland (1655–1660), Błotków together with the palace were ransacked and burned to the ground by Swedish soldiers.

In the second half of the 17th century, Błotków with its ruined palace was purchased by Castellan of Vilnius Józef Bogusław Słuszka, who founded here a town, named Terespol after his wife, Teresa née Gosiewska. In 1697, Holy Trinity church was built here, soon afterwards, Dominican friars settled in Terespol. In 1748, Terespol became property of Grand Treasurer of Lithuania Georg Detlev von Flemming, who made great contribution to the development of the town, draining local swamps and building a number of dykes and canals. Furthermore, Flemming introduced a number of German settlers, and built a manor house in the location of the destroyed royal castle. In 1757, one weekly and two one-day annual fairs were established. In 1764, Terespol was ransacked by private soldiers of Polish magnate Karol Stanisław "Panie Kochanku" Radziwiłł, who waged a personal war with Flemming for his support of the Czartoryski family. Later on the town passed to the Czartoryski family.

After the Third Partition of Poland (1795) Terespol briefly belonged to the Habsburg Empire. Later it was part of the Polish Duchy of Warsaw, and from 1815 to 1916, it belonged to Russian-controlled Congress Poland. The town burned in several fires, but continued to prosper, due to the construction of a highway from Warsaw to Brest (1819–1823). After the November Uprising, Terespol belonged to the Russian Imperial government. In 1855, due to the construction of Brest Fortress, Terespol was moved westwards, and all buildings in the old town were destroyed for military purposes. In 1867, a railroad to Warsaw was completed; in 1870, it was extended to Brest. As a result of Russian discriminatory regulations the town saw a large influx of Jews, who then became the town's largest ethnic group.

In 1915, all residents living within  from the fortress were forcibly resettled into Russia, and during the evacuation, the town was ransacked and burned. Terespol was reintegrated with Poland, after the country regained independence in 1918. In the Second Polish Republic Terespol was part of the Lublin Voivodeship.

During World War II Terespol was briefly occupied by the Soviets in September 1939, and then by Nazi Germany from 1939 to 1944. During the occupation, most Jews were murdered in the Holocaust. The Germans also established a transit camp for Polish prisoners of war in Terespol. Terespol became a border town after the Soviet Union annexed former eastern territories of Poland.

Climate
Terespol has an oceanic climate  (Köppen climate classification: Cfb) using the  isotherm or a humid continental climate (Köppen climate classification: Dfb) using the  isotherm.

Sights
Around Terespol one can find some of the old fortifications that were once part of the Brest Fortress. In Terespol there is a former powder magazine of the fortress. Other sights include the 19th-century monument to the construction of the highway connecting Warsaw with nearby Brest, and modern monuments: the Independence Monument and the Tadeusz Kościuszko monument.

International relations

Twin towns – Sister cities
Terespol is twinned with:
 Brest in Belarus

Gallery

References

External links
 

Cities and towns in Lublin Voivodeship
Biała Podlaska County
Belarus–Poland border crossings
Brest Litovsk Voivodeship
Siedlce Governorate
Kholm Governorate
Lublin Voivodeship (1919–1939)
Holocaust locations in Poland